Elijah Wolfson is an American writer and editor. He is currently an editorial director at Time primarily covering health and science. Previously, he was an editor at Quartz. and before that served as senior editor at Newsweek, where he covered science, health, technology and culture. Wolfson has contributed to The Atlantic, Al Jazeera America, Vice, and the Huffington Post, and has appeared on MSNBC, BBC World News, NPR and other media outlets.

Wolfson was born in Cambridge, Massachusetts, and raised in Ridgewood, New Jersey, and Manhattan, New York. He studied rhetoric and creative writing at the University of California, Berkeley. He is the son of Dr. Elizabeth Wolfson a psychotherapist, and of the scholar Elliot Wolfson. In 2013, he married the Indian-American writer and board member of the Roosevelt Institute, Jas Johl. The two separated in 2017.

In 2013, Wolfson was awarded a Langeloth Health Journalism Fellowship by the John Jay College Center on Media, Crime, and Justice. In 2015, he was awarded an International Reporting Project Fellowship, and covered the Nepal Earthquake of 2015 from the ground. In 2015, Wolfson was also awarded the Metcalf Institute Fellowship and the 2015 Population Institute Global Media Award for his reporting on the relationship between climate change and access to family planning in developing countries.

In 2016, his Newsweek cover story investigated allegations of child abuse at Jewish Chabad school system of New York. The story sparked protests.

References

Year of birth missing (living people)
Living people
American male journalists
UC Berkeley College of Engineering alumni
People from Ridgewood, New Jersey
People from Manhattan